Nikola Moro (born 12 March 1998) is a Croatian professional footballer who plays as a defensive midfielder for  club Bologna on loan from the Russian Premier League club Dynamo Moscow and the Croatia national team.

Club career

Dinamo Zagreb
Aged six, he started football, moving to Zagreb aged 11. A Hajduk Split fan in his early days in Solin, Nikola's father Miro yearned for him to contemplate a career at the Hajduk academy, but he went to the Dinamo Zagreb academy instead. Nikola joined the senior Dinamo Zagreb team from the youth academy in 2014.

Moro played a full 90 minutes in his league debut for his senior team versus Lokomotiva in May 2016. He made his Champions League debut on 7 December, in a 2–0 away defeat to Juventus. On 22 February 2017, he signed a new contract until 2022.

On 27 March 2018, in an international match against Moldova U21, he suffered a severe injury after tearing his anterior cruciate ligament. He came back to the team on 26 September for the Croatian Cup game against Sloga Mravince. He made his Europa League debut on 14 February 2019 in a 2–1 away defeat to Viktoria Plzeň.

On 6 November, in a decisive Champions League home game against Shakhtar Donetsk, he was sent off in the 74th minute with Shakhtar scoring a late equalizer for 3–3 to deny Dinamo a direct qualification for the knockout phase.

Dynamo Moscow
On 17 August 2020, he signed a five-year contract with Russian Premier League club Dynamo Moscow. He made his debut two days later in a 2–0 victory over Rostov, coming on for Daniil Fomin in the 69th minute. On 18 October, he scored his first goal for the club as Dynamo lost 3–1 to CSKA Moscow.

Bologna
On 29 August 2022, Moro joined Bologna in Italy on loan until the end of the 2022–23 season, with an option to buy.

International career
Representing Croatia at U16, U17 and U19 level, Nikola Moro made the quarter-finals of the 2015 FIFA U-17 World Cup eventually losing to Mali. He also represented Croatia U21 at the 2019 and 2021 UEFA Under-21 Euros, captaining the team to the quarter-finals of the latter tournament for the first time in their history.

On 17 May 2021, Moro was named in the preliminary 34-man squad for the UEFA Euro 2020, but did not make the final 26. He earned his first call-up to the senior Croatia team on 16 August 2021, ahead of the September World Cup qualifiers against Russia, Slovakia and Slovenia. However, he did not debut until 29 March 2022, when he made an appearance in a friendly 2–1 victory over Bulgaria.

Career statistics

Club

International

Honours
Dinamo Zagreb
Prva HNL: 2015–16, 2017–18, 2018–19, 2019–20
Croatian Cup: 2015–16, 2017–18
Croatian Super Cup: 2019

Individual
 2015 UEFA European Under-17 Championship Team of the Tournament

References

External links
 
 Nikola Moro at Talentshunter.eu

1998 births
Living people
People from Solin
Footballers from Split, Croatia
Association football midfielders
Croatian footballers
Croatia youth international footballers
Croatia under-21 international footballers
Croatia international footballers
GNK Dinamo Zagreb II players
GNK Dinamo Zagreb players
FC Dynamo Moscow players
Bologna F.C. 1909 players
First Football League (Croatia) players
Croatian Football League players
Russian Premier League players
Serie A players
Croatian expatriate footballers
Croatian expatriate sportspeople in Russia
Expatriate footballers in Russia
Croatian expatriate sportspeople in Italy
Expatriate footballers in Italy